The Boliniales are an order of fungi within the class Sordariomycetes.

References

 
Ascomycota orders